Celia is a Spanish children's television series created by José Luis Borau in 1992 for the national Spanish public-service channel Televisión Española. It is based on the classic Spanish children's novels of the same name by Elena Fortún, primarily Celia, lo que dice (1929) and Celia en el colegio (1932). The books and television series tell the stories of a wild seven-year-old girl named Celia Gálvez de Moltanbán. In addition to focusing on Celia, the show touched lightly on Spanish life in the 1930s, such as the upcoming civil war, a changing nation, and the social issues and ideas at the time.

Cristina Cruz Mínguez was cast as the titular character, and the script was adapted by author and screenwriter Carmen Martín Gaite. The creator, Borau, directed and produced the series. Though successful when it originally premiered, Celia was cancelled after six episodes. The sixth and final episode ended with a "to be continued" (Continuará), but the following episode was never released.

Production
After the "Celia" books by Elena Fortún had been brought to his attention by Spanish author and screenwriter Carmen Martín Gaite, director and producer José Luis Borau insisted on together creating a television adaptation of Fortún's works; Gaite was not convinced and was not sure the project would work. When the project was finally green-lit by Televisión Española, a search began for a seven-year-old girl to play the title role of Celia; then-inexperienced Cristina Cruz Mínguez was chosen out of over 2,000 girls who auditioned for the part, though some sources suggested that around 3,000 girls auditioned. Many of the girls not chosen to play the title role were instead cast as other characters in the series, such as María Teresa, Celia's friend. A television documentary was produced, entitled "Buscando a Celia" ("Searching for Celia"), which showed the process of finding the right "Celia"; the documentary contained brief interviews with many different girls and some of their parents as well. When broadcast, the short documentary served as publicity for the upcoming series.

Director José Luis Borau stated during the premiere ceremony of the series that he had had two reasons for his production: One, to pay homage to Elena Fortún, whom he described as one of the most important authors the children of Spain possibly ever had; and two, that the children of Spain "must be given the best. We mustn't take advantage of them, we mustn't trick them, we mustn't give them just anything. Because they deserve the best." Gaite expressed her amazement at young actress Cristina Cruz Mínguez's professional behaviour during the filming of the series: "I remember one scene", she said, "that was filmed very late at night in a circus close to El Escorial, and I didn't hear this girl complain one single time. She didn't ask where her mother was or anything." During the last minutes, the microphone was handed to Mínguez herself, who thanked Gaite and Borau for their help during the production of Celia.

Theme song 
The series' theme song, composed by the Spanish duet Vainica Doble, does not have an official name, but it is often referred to as "Celia" or "Hay en Madrid una niña" ("There is in Madrid a girl"); its basic lyrics and music are based on the classic Spanish playground song, "En Cádiz hay una niña" (In Cádiz there is a girl"). Though the song is in Spanish, there are brief instances of English and Latin; the English line, "Be quiet, you are a naughty girl!" is presumably sung by the character of Miss Nelly, the English governess. The complete series' opening is a montage of drawings of Celia by one of the original illustrators of the novels, Francisco Molina Gallent.

Cast

Cristina Cruz Mínguez – Celia Gálvez de Montalbán
Ana Duato – María del Pilar Gálvez de Montalbán (Mamá)
Pedro Díez del Corral – Pablo Gálvez (Papá)
Adela Armengol – Julia Gálvez
Sian Thomas – Miss Nelly
Miguel Magaña – Juan Antonio 'Baby/Cuchifritín' Gálvez de Montalbán
Concha Salinas – Juana
Josep Cortés - Don Pedro
Carmen Rossi – Doña Petra
Concha Leza – Cook
Aurora Redondo – Doña Benita
Tito Valverde – Rodrigo Gálvez
Diana Salcedo – Basílides
Miguel Ángel García – Pronobis
Tito Augusto – Lamparón
María Isbert – Madre Superiora
Paloma Paso Jardiel – Madre Loreto
Montse Pérez López – Madre Bibiana
Yelena Samarina – Madre Isolina
Sílvia Munt – Madre Corazón
Paula Soldevila – Sister
Nathalie Seseña – Sister
Silvia Casanova – Sister
Rafael Díaz – Juanón
Ángel de Andrés – Don Restituto
Luz María Gómez – Rafaela
Mario Maranzana – Ringmaster

Plot
Celia is a seven-year-old girl living with her family in her home located in a street, la Calle Serrano, in Madrid, Spain. Celia has a way of questioning everything around her, in a way of childish innocence, as well as ingenuity; she wonders about the identity of the Three Wise Men, for instance, and the strange ideas and thoughts that adults tend to say. Celia's mother and father have little time to spend with their daughter; she is away visiting friends or out shopping and often comes home very late at night, leaving Celia in the care of Miss Nelly, the English governess, while he is busy attending to his work in his office. Celia is not allowed to play much with her little brother "Baby", whom she names "Cuchifritín", because he is too small and fragile, but spends time with other playmates such as Solita, the porter's daughter and María Teresa, another girl her age. While under the care of Miss Nelly, whom Celia cannot stand, or Juana, the maid, Celia often finds ways to get into all sorts of scrapes, though mostly unintentionally. Eventually, feeling insulted and humiliated, Miss Nelly returns to England, and Celia's mother calls upon an elderly woman, Doña Benita, to look after the girl. It turns out however, that Doña Benita's imagination is as wild and innocent as Celia's and the two become very close. Celia is enthralled by Doña Benita's fantastic stories about fairies and demons, and all sorts of odd beliefs and superstitions. Following an eventful summer at the beach and the Spanish countryside, Celia's mother, with some help from her sister-in-law Julia, convinces her husband to have the girl sent off to a convent, where they hope she'll learn discipline and good behaviour. Once at the school with the nuns, Celia continues to make mischief and form many chaotic events at the convent, often with the help of other girls.

Characters

Gálvez Family
Celia Gálvez de Montalbán (played by Cristina Cruz Mínguez): The protagonist, Celia is a seven-year-old girl with a wild imagination. She has an ingenious way of questioning the things adults say and do, expresses her mind freely and lives in a fairy tale world of her own. Celia often gets into scrapes, some mild and some more serious, but seldom with bad intentions.
Pablo Gálvez (played by Pedro Díez del Corral): Celia's father, he works hard to support his family. At one point he comes to realize that he is tired of who he is and the work he does. He loves Celia dearly and is very unhappy when he must send her away with the nuns. Wanting to improve their family's situation, he and his wife leave for another country hoping to find work.
María del Pilar de Montalbán (played by Ana Duato): Celia's mother, she loves her husband and children dearly, but spends much time outside their home. She is a very social woman and frequently goes out shopping and to have tea with her friends. When Celia passes from being a handful to being a threat to her little brother's safety, María has no option but to take her sister-in-law Julia's advice and send her daughter with the nuns.
Juan Antonio "Baby/Cuchifritín" Gálvez (played by Miguel Magaña): Celia's baby brother, he is named "Cuchifritín" by Doña Benita; Celia likes the name and uses it from that day on. Cuchifritín is often Celia's only playmate, and her sometimes rough play doesn't particularly please him. Celia accidentally makes Cuchifritín very ill on one occasion, which is when Celia's parents decide to send her away.
Tía Julia (played by Adela Armengol): Tía Julia is Celia's aunt and Pablo's sister. She often tries to convince her brother and sister-in-law that the best way to deal with Celia would be to send her to a convent. When she sees that Doña Benita does not help the situation, she tries her suggestion once again and is finally successful at convincing Pablo.

Household staff
Doña Benita (played by Aurora Redondo): Doña Benita is an elderly woman who arrives in Madrid in answer to a request made by Celia's mother. She is asked to replace Miss Nelly and look after the girl, but it turns out that Doña Benita's imagination is as wild as Celia's. Doña Benita joins Celia in many of her escapes and always defends her.
Miss Nelly (played by Sian Thomas): She is Celia's English governess and has come to Spain to look after Celia and teach her the English language. She is unsuccessful, however, though she manages to teach the girl some English. Feeling insulted and humiliated, one day Miss Nelly resigns and announces that she returns to England. She is then replaced by Doña Benita.
Juana (played by Concha Salinas): Juana is the household maid. She has a short temper and little patience with the girl and agrees that she needs to be disciplined. She often says that if she had her way, she'd whack Celia until she learned to behave like she should. Though she often quarrels with the girl, she, too loves her and worries whenever she is outside the home and can't be found.
Doña Petra (played by Carmen Rossi): A kind servant, Doña Petra is in charge of the sewing at home. She helps Celia prepare her costume for Carnival and is always good to the girl.
The Cook (played by Concha Leza): Just like Doña Petra, the cook is also very kind to Celia. When she and Doña Benita arrive home with Picarín, the donkey, she prepares worm milk for it to drink. Like most of the less educated people, the cook is highly superstitious.

Broadcast
Since its original television debut in 1992, Celia remains a popular series and has been aired on Televisión Española numerous times. Often broadcast in black and white in order to give the series a more nostalgic value fit of the story's time setting of the 1930s, the series would be shown one episode a day during a period of six days, usually beginning on a Monday.

Home video
In 1993, Spanish distributor Editorial América Ibérica released the series for the first time on VHS. The six different episodes were sold individually in a colorful collection entitled "El mundo de Celia" ("The World of Celia"), and each was packed together with a reprint of Elena Fortún's first six "Celia" novels: Celia, lo que dice (1929) was included with the first episode of the series, "Soy Celia", Celia en el colegio (1932) with the second, "Doña Benita", Celia novelista (1934) with "El verano", Celia en el mundo (1934) with "En el colegio", Celia y sus amigos (1935) with "Ni santa, ni mártir" and Celia madrecita (1939) with "¡Hasta la vista!". Editorial América Ibérica did not produce reprints of the remaining Celia novels. These VHS and book sets were sold primarily at Kioscos and local bookstores as opposed to large video stores.

In 2001, distributor Divisa Home Video released the series on VHS and Region 2 DVD as part of their extensive "Series clásicas" ("Classic series") collection that offered a wide variety of classic Spanish television series, mostly for older audiences. All six episodes were released together in one single set of three cassettes or discs. The latter has two audio options, Spanish Dolby Digital 5.1 or 2.0 Stereo; subtitles in English, German, French, Italian and Portuguese; and extra features including a 1992 featurette, "Buscando a Celia" ("Looking for Celia"). A 2-disc re-release of the pack (three episodes per disc) also featured the "Celia: La premiere" documentary not included in the first release. Divisa also released this collection, with identical specifications, except for 1080p video, as a Digipak Blu-ray in 2012, which was reissued in a keep case in 2020.

Reception
In 1993, Celia was awarded the TP de Oro for Best Dramatic National Series in Spain. The TP de Oro is considered one of the most prestigious, if not the most prestigious, awards given to television programs and actors in the country.

Episode listing

References

External links

Celia at Radio Televisión Española – full episodes

Spanish children's television series
Television shows set in Madrid
1992 Spanish television series debuts
1990s Spanish television series
La 1 (Spanish TV channel) network series